Communist Party of Cantabria (in Spanish: Partido Comunista de Cantabria), is the federation of the Communist Party of Spain (PCE) in Cantabria.

Cantabria
Political parties in Cantabria
Political parties with year of establishment missing